Sadayam is a 1992 Indian Malayalam-language psychological drama written by M. T. Vasudevan Nair and directed by Sibi Malayil. It stars Mohanlal, Thilakan, Nedumudi Venu, Murali, Sreenivasan, Maathu, K. P. A. C. Lalitha, and T. G. Ravi. The film was produced and distributed by G. P. Vijayakumar of Seven Arts Films. The film score was composed by Johnson.

The story follows convict Sathyanathan (Mohanlal) who is awaiting capital punishment for the murder of two young girls and two men. Mohanlal's performance in the film is regarded as one of the finest in his career. Despite faring poorly at the box office, the film came to be appreciated years later for their cult following. M. T. Vasudevan Nair won the National Film Awards for Best Screenplay.

Plot 

Sathyanathan is condemned to death for brutally murdering four persons – two adults and two young girls – and is awaiting his final call. He shows no remorse and is just as cheerful as a man who knows he has done no wrong. The prison doctor Dr. Nambiar's son Vijayan is one of Sathyan's victims; he wants to sign his death certificate and see the fear in his eyes as he is led up the gallows but the doctor is just as puzzled as to why the crime was committed.

There are appeals in lower courts and petitions for pardons by the cops as a matter of routine but Sathyan has no great interest in living. Eventually, when he wishes to start life again on a fresh slate because he now wants to live,  in an O Henry-sque moment, he's denied a pardon and on Sept 29th, 1991, two years after he is originally convicted of the multiple murders, he is hanged to death. In a series of flashbacks, the story unfolds focusing on Sathyan's past and recreates the chilling crime scene, explaining his actions.

Sathyan is a ‘bastard’ who is bullied and abused in his childhood by the people around him until he is rescued by a priest who realizes that the kid is a talented artist. Under the aegis of Father, Sathyan becomes a painter who makes a living by painting sign boards and hoardings. As part of one of his assignments, he takes a rented house in Kozhikode next to a house of ill-virtue where Jaya and her two young sisters live with their aunts. They have no future to look forward to and it is only a matter of time when the aunts get them to carry out prostitution.

He helps the kids in their education and gets Jaya a job in the company in which he's working.  Sathyan likes Jaya and wishes to marry her and settle down in life but destiny has other ideas; circumstances force her to end up as a prostitute and there are signs that her sisters will sink in the same quagmire later. In a moment of extreme paranoia, Sathyan kills the two girls in a bid to save them from prostitution and eventually both the guys responsible for her state.

The film then cuts back to the present as Sathyan wants to live on a fresh slate.

In the end, Sathyan is hanged to death, followed by his funeral.

Cast 

 Mohanlal as Sathyanathan
 Thilakan as Dr. K. V. G. Nambiar
 Nedumudi Venu as Father Dominic 
 Maathu as Jaya
 KPAC Lalitha as Devakiamma
 Janardhanan as Harishankar, Police superintendent
 Sreenivasan as Kunjali
 Murali as Madhavan Jailer (Police Officer)
 Mahesh as Vijayan
 Kaveri as Lathika, Jaya's sister
 Augustine as Chandran
 T. G. Ravi as Kanaran
 M. G. Sasi as Samuel
 Kozhikode Narayanan Nair as Ramettan

Crew 
 Art Director: Krishnankutty
 Production Controller: K. Mohanan

Awards
 National Film Award for Best Screenplay - M. T. Vasudevan Nair
 Filmfare Award for Best Director – Malayalam - Siby Malayil
 Kerala Film Journalists Award for Best Actor - Mohanlal

Soundtrack
Johnson composed the songs, for which the lyrics were written by Kaithapram Damodaran Namboothiri.

References

External links 
 

1992 films
1990s Malayalam-language films
Films with screenplays by M. T. Vasudevan Nair
1990s thriller drama films
1990s psychological drama films
Indian psychological drama films
Indian prison films
Films shot in Kozhikode
Films directed by Sibi Malayil
Films scored by Johnson
Films whose writer won the Best Original Screenplay National Film Award
1992 drama films